The orphica is a portable piano invented by Carl Leopold Röllig in the late 18th century.  Like a guitar, the orphica could be held on a shoulder strap, thus being an early forerunner of the modern keytar.

Only a few orphicas were made in Vienna from 1795 to 1810; about 30 orphicas are still in existence today.

Beethoven's compositions for orphica

Among the few composers writing for the orphica was Ludwig van Beethoven.  According to a letter of Beethoven's friend Franz Gerhard Wegeler from December 23, 1827, Wegeler had 2 Stückchen für die Orphica, die Bhven für meine Frau componirte ('2 small pieces for the orphica which Beethoven composed for my wife').  This refers to the two pieces of 1798, WoO. 51, formerly erroneously titled Leichte Klaviersonate.

Gallery

References

Further reading 
 Carl Leopold Röllig, Orphica. Ein musikalisches Instrument. Erfunden von C. L. Röllig, Vienna 1795
 Benjamin Vogel, Orphicas, Genuin, Less Genuin and Fakes, in: The Galpin Society Journal, Nr. 57 (May 2004),  and 204–205
 Andreas Beurmann, Das Buch vom Klavier. Die Sammlung Beurmann im Museum für Kunst und Gewerbe in Hamburg und auf Gut Hasselburg in Ostholstein, 2008
 Klaus Martin Kopitz, Beethoven as a Composer for the Orphica: A New Source for WoO 51, in: The Beethoven Journal, vol. 22, No 1 (Summer 2007),  (PDF)

External links
 
 Metropolitan Museum of Art

Piano
Keyboard instruments